The Jeffery Cemetery is a historic cemetery in rural western Izard County, Arkansas. It has sixteen marked burial sites, and another ten to twenty that have no marking. The earliest dated burial occurred in 1816, and the latest in 1908. The cemetery is located on land granted to Jehoiada Jeffery for his service in the War of 1812, and is the only surviving site associated with his life. Jeffery is the first known permanent white settler in north central Arkansas.

The cemetery was listed on the National Register of Historic Places in 1999.

See also
 A.C. Jeffery Farmstead, built by Jehoaida's son Augustus
 National Register of Historic Places listings in Izard County, Arkansas

References

External links
 

Cemeteries on the National Register of Historic Places in Arkansas
Buildings and structures completed in 1846
Buildings and structures in Izard County, Arkansas
National Register of Historic Places in Izard County, Arkansas
Cemeteries established in the 1840s